Isla is one of the constituent barangays in the city of Valenzuela, Metro Manila, Philippines.

In Filipino, the word "Isla" means "Island". The namesake of Isla came from its natural geography where it is surrounded by rivers and fishery ponds. Nasing Santiago, the youngest mayor of Valenzuela and former governor of Malolos, Bulacan, used to hold residence in Isla.

Festivals
Residents celebrate the fiesta of Sta. Cruz, their patron saint, every last Saturday of April.

Landmarks
Landmarks in Isla include the Sta. Cruz Chapel, Isla Elementary School, the Island Pavilion Resort and Restaurante Pontemar.

References

External links

Valenzuela, Philippines official site

Barangays of Metro Manila
Valenzuela, Metro Manila